Gesvan-e Yek (also Romanized as Geşvān-e Yek, Gaswané Yek, and Gesvān Yak; also known as Gīsovān-e Yek, and Gīsvān-e Yek) is a village in Veys Rural District, Veys District, Bavi County, Khuzestan Province, Iran. At the 2006 census, its population was 109, in 13 families.

References 

Populated places in Bavi County